Idaho Red is a 1929 American silent Western film directed by Robert De Lacey and starring Tom Tyler, Patricia Caron and Frankie Darro.

Cast
 Tom Tyler as Andy Thornton 
 Patricia Caron as Mary Regan 
 Frankie Darro as Tadpole 
 Barney Furey as Dave Lucas 
 Lew Meehan as George Wilkins

References

External links
 

1929 films
1929 Western (genre) films
Films directed by Robert De Lacey
1920s English-language films
American black-and-white films
Film Booking Offices of America films
Silent American Western (genre) films
1920s American films